Heikka is a surname. Notable people with the surname include:

Earl Heikka (1910–1941), American sculptor of figurines
Mikko Heikka (born 1944), Finnish Lutheran bishop

See also
Heikki

Finnish-language surnames